Presidential elections were held in the Gambia on 18 October 2001. The result was a victory for the incumbent Yahya Jammeh, who took just over 50% of the vote.

Conduct
Pre-election violence resulted in the death of an unarmed opposition supporter who was shot by a police officer, and several injuries. The government also expelled a British diplomat who had attended an opposition rally.

Results

References

Further reading

External links
Gambia election: Candidates' profiles BBC News, 17 October 2001

2001 in the Gambia
Presidential elections in the Gambia
Gambia
Election and referendum articles with incomplete results
October 2001 events in Africa